Saxifraga marginata, the Kabschia saxifrage, is a species of flowering plant in the family Saxifragaceae, native to southeastern Europe. It and its cultivar 'Balkan' (formerly the rocheliana subtaxon) have both gained the Royal Horticultural Society's Award of Garden Merit as ornamentals.

References

marginata
Flora of Southeastern Europe
Plants described in 1822